Horenka or Gorenka may refer to:
 Horenka, Bucha Raion, Kyiv Oblast, a village in Ukraine
 , a tributary of the Irpin